James Poindexter (born March 4, 1949) is an American sports shooter. He competed in the trap event at the 1972 Summer Olympics.

References

1949 births
Living people
American male sport shooters
Olympic shooters of the United States
Shooters at the 1972 Summer Olympics
Sportspeople from Los Angeles